The 2017 Wake Forest Demon Deacons football team represented Wake Forest University during the 2017 NCAA Division I FBS football season. The team was led by fourth-year head coach Dave Clawson, and played their home games at BB&T Field. Wake Forest competed in the Atlantic Division of the Atlantic Coast Conference as they have since the league's inception in 1953. They finished the season 8–5, 4–4 in ACC play to finish in a three-way tie for third place in the Atlantic Division. They were invited to the Belk Bowl where they defeated Texas A&M.

Recruits

Schedule

Coaching staff

Roster

Game summaries

Presbyterian

@ Boston College

Utah State

@ Appalachian State

Florida State

@ Clemson

@ Georgia Tech

Louisville

@ Notre Dame

@ Syracuse

NC State

Duke

vs. Texas A&M – Belk Bowl

2018 NFL draft

References

Wake Forest
Wake Forest Demon Deacons football seasons
Duke's Mayo Bowl champion seasons
Wake Forest Demon Deacons football